Sandy Beach is a summer village in Alberta, Canada. It is located on Sandy Lake, northwest from Edmonton along Highway 642.

Demographics 

In the 2016 Census of Population conducted by Statistics Canada, the Summer Village of Sandy Beach had a population of 278 living in 126 of its 264 total private dwellings, a  change from its 2011 population of 223.

See also 
List of communities in Alberta
List of summer villages in Alberta
List of resort villages in Saskatchewan

References

External links 

1956 establishments in Alberta
Summer villages in Alberta